Dogoli  is a village in Bijapur district, in the Indian state of Chhattisgarh.

References

Villages in Bijapur district, Chhattisgarh